Cheongsando (hangul: 청산도) is an island off the south coast of the Republic of Korea. It is the main island of Cheongsan-myeon, Wando County, South Jeolla Province.  Accompanied by the four inhabited islands of Daemodo, Somodo, Yeoseodo, and Jangdo, and several uninhabited islands, it is called Cheongsando ('green mountain island') because it remains green through four seasons. It has long been called Seonsan or Seonwon, meaning that a Taoist hermit dwells on the island because of the beautiful view which creates a harmony with the clear and blue archipelago.

Transportation

Passenger ferry 
A ferry that carries vehicles operates five times a day between Wando Port in Wando County and Cheongsando Port, taking 50 minutes for each travel. In April and May with Cheongsando Slow Walking Festival is under way, 8 voyages are available on weekdays and 15 voyages are available on weekend.

Village bus 

Every day, village bus runs five times from Cheongsando Port to Jinsan-ri and twice to Gwondeok-ri.

Culture

Gudeuljangnon Paddy field 
Cheongsando has a traditional agricultural system. It has long abounded in steep terrains and stones as well as sandy soil where water drains away quickly. Short of water for paddy rice farming, the area has a rather unfavorable agricultural environment for watery field farming. 'Gudeuljangnon Paddy field' is a paddy field artificially created by reorganizing natural environment to produce more rice in such unfavorable conditions. 

Cheongsando 'Gudeuljangnon Paddy field' in Wando County was designated Republic of Korea's Important Agricultural Heritage No. 1 on January 22, 2013 according to the strict criteria of value, partnership, and effectiveness of heritage in deference to Globally Important Agricultural Heritage Systems (GIAHS) of Food and Agriculture Organization of the United Nations (FAO).

Beombawi ('Tiger Rock') 

The legend has it that a tiger that lived on Cheongsando long ago was surprised at its own roar leveled at the rock and ran off the island. As compasses do not work near the rock due to strong magnetism, it is also called the Rock of Mystery. 

From Beombawi, you get a full view of Cheongsando, and on a fine day, the view stretches as far as Yeoseodo, Geomundo, and Jejudo.

Slow Walk 
Designated as the first Slow City in Asia, Cheongsando in Wando-gun hosts the annual Cheongsando Slow Walking Festival. 

Cheongsando Slow Walk used to be a trail for the mobility of the island residents. It was named so, because the walkers would naturally slow down, touched by the scenic view. 2010 saw the opening of the total 11 courses (17-gil) stretching 42.195km. 

Characteristically, the courses are designed so that the walkers can see a mix of the scenery along the trail, people who dwell nearby, and stories related to different courses. The beauty of the trail got its outside recognition, and in 2011 it was designated as World Slow Walk No. 1 by Cittaslow International.

Filming 
The island drew attention as a tourist attraction after it served as a shooting location for the film Seopyeonje by Im Kwon-taek. The television dramas Spring Waltz and Scent of a Woman were also partially filmed at the island.

Festival 
'Cheongsando Slow Walking Festival' proceeds for the whole of every April.

References

External links
Wando Tourist Information 
Wando County 
Gudeuljangnon Paddy field 

Islands of South Jeolla Province